The Imperial Order of St. James of the Sword was an honorific order of the Empire of Brazil, originating from the Portuguese Order of Saint James of the Sword. "Nationalized" by Dom Pedro I of Brazil, this order has followed the reform proposed by Dona Maria II of Portugal, which had recommended to the judiciary. The Portuguese order was offered to those who made advancements in literature, science and art, while the Brazilian order was almost exclusively for military personnel, both by Pedro I and his son Dom Pedro II. The order was awarded under the Order of Pedro I.
 
The order was stripped to its religious characteristics by a decree on September 9, 1843.

On 22 March 1890, the order was cancelled as national order by the interim government of United States of Brazil. Since the deposition in 1889 of the last Brazilian monarch, Emperor Pedro II, the order continues as a house order being awarded by the Heads of the House of Orleans-Braganza, pretenders to the defunct throne of Brazil. The current Brazilian Imperial Family is split into two branches Petrópolis and Vassouras, and as a consequence the Grand Mastership of the Order is disputed between those two branches.

See also
Order of Aviz (Brazil)
Order of the Southern Cross
Order of the Rose
Order of Pedro I
Order of Christ (Brazil)

References

Orders, decorations, and medals of Brazil